HMS Comet was one of 20 s built for the Royal Navy in the 1910s. Completed in 1911 she saw active service in the First World War.

Design and description
The Admiralty provided general specifications, but each shipyard did their own detailed design so that ships often varied in size. The ships displaced  at deep load and their crew numbered 72 officers and ratings.

The destroyers were powered by a single Parsons steam turbine that drove three propeller shafts using steam provided by four Yarrow boilers.

The primary armament of the ships consisted of a pair of BL  MK VIII guns in single, unprotected pivot mounts fore and aft of the superstructure. They were also armed with two single QF 12-pounder guns, one on each broadside between the forward and centre funnels. The destroyer were equipped with a pair of single rotating mounts for 21-inch (533 mm) torpedo tubes amidships and carried two reload torpedoes.

Construction and career

Comet was ordered under the 1909–1910 Naval Programme from Fairfield Shipbuilding & Engineering Company. The ship was laid down at the company's Govan shipyard on 1 February 1910, launched on 23 June and commissioned in June 1911. She was torpedoed and sunk on 6 August 1918.

References

Bibliography
 
 
 
 

 

Acorn-class destroyers
1910 ships
Ships built in Govan
World War I destroyers of the United Kingdom
Ships sunk in collisions
World War I shipwrecks in the Mediterranean Sea